Kalnciems Parish  is an administrative unit of Jelgava Municipality in the Semigallia region of Latvia (prior to the 2009 administrative reforms the Jelgava District). It was created in 2010 from the village of Kalnciems and its countryside territory, and is distinct from an earlier parish of the same name.

References

External links

Parishes of Latvia
2010 establishments in Latvia
Jelgava Municipality
Semigallia